Hubei Provincial Library is located at south of Sha Lake, Wuhan. It was established in 1904 as Bureau of Books at Wudang Palace, Wuchang, by Zhang Zhidong, the viceroy of Huguang. The New library has a construction area of about 100,000 square meters, the reading rooms can hold 6300 people at the same time. The library has a collection of more than 5,500,000 volumes as of 2017.

References

1904 establishments in China
Libraries in Wuhan
Libraries established in 1904
Education in Hubei
Major National Historical and Cultural Sites in Hubei